The twelfth season of the American television medical drama Grey's Anatomy was ordered on May 7, 2015, by ABC. It premiered on September 24, 2015, in the United States on ABC. The twelfth season includes the show's 250th episode, "Guess Who's Coming to Dinner", which is the fifth episode of the season. The season is produced by ABC Studios, in association with Shondaland Production Company and The Mark Gordon Company; the showrunners being Stacy McKee and William Harper. The season commenced airing with the premiere episode "Sledgehammer" and concluded with the finale episode "Family Affair".

This season was the first not to feature Patrick Dempsey as Dr. Derek Shepherd following the death of the character at the end of the eleventh season. On June 5, 2015 ABC announced that Jason George has been promoted to series-regular status after having performed a recurring role as Dr. Ben Warren since the sixth season of the medical drama. Part way into the season, Martin Henderson was introduced as new regular character, Dr. Nathan Riggs. In the tenth episode of the season, Giacomo Gianniotti was also promoted to series-regular status as intern Andrew DeLuca. 

The season garnered 11.21 million average viewers and was ranked #21 overall in total viewers which is 15 spots higher than the previous season. TV critics and analysts noted the renewed interest in viewership with Rich Kissell of Variety calling it a 'renaissance.' Grey's Anatomy finished the 2015–16 television season as ABC's highest-rated drama in the 18-49 demographics and also ranked among the top 5 dramas on all of broadcast, averaging  a 3.9 rating in the demo, an unprecedented accomplishment for a show in its 12th season. On March 3, 2016, the network renewed Grey's Anatomy for a thirteenth season.

Episodes 

The number in the "No. overall" column refers to the episode's number within the overall series, whereas the number in the "No. in season" column refers to the episode's number within this particular season. "U.S. viewers in millions" refers to the number of Americans in millions who watched the episodes live. Each episode of this season is named after a song.

Cast and characters

Main 
 Ellen Pompeo as Dr. Meredith Grey
 Justin Chambers as Dr. Alex Karev
 Chandra Wilson as Dr. Miranda Bailey
 James Pickens Jr. as Dr. Richard Webber
 Sara Ramirez as Dr. Callie Torres
 Kevin McKidd as Dr. Owen Hunt
 Jessica Capshaw as Dr. Arizona Robbins
 Sarah Drew as Dr. April Kepner
 Jesse Williams as Dr. Jackson Avery
 Caterina Scorsone as Dr. Amelia Shepherd
 Camilla Luddington as Dr. Jo Wilson
 Jerrika Hinton as Dr. Stephanie Edwards
 Kelly McCreary as Dr. Maggie Pierce
 Jason George as Dr. Ben Warren
 Martin Henderson as Dr. Nathan Riggs
 Giacomo Gianniotti as Dr. Andrew DeLuca

Recurring 
 Joe Adler as Dr. Isaac Cross 
 Samantha Sloyan as Dr. Penelope Blake
 Joe Dinicol as Dr. Mitchell Spencer
 Debbie Allen as Dr. Catherine Avery
 Nicole Cummins as Paramedic Nicole
 Vivian Nixon as Dr. Hannah Brody
 Scott Elrod as Dr. Major Will Thorpe
 Wilmer Valderrama as Kyle Diaz
 Vanessa Bell Calloway as Lucinda Gamble
 Rebecca McFarland as Tara Parker
 Morgan Lily as Jennifer Parker

Notable guests 
 Joey Lauren Adams as Dr. Tracy McConnell 
 Mandalynn Carlson as Jessica Tanner
 Lindsay Kay Hayward as Jade Bell
 Maya Stojan as Tatiana Flauto
 Debra Mooney as Evelyn Hunt
 Drew Rausch as John Finch
 Bill Smitrovich as Therapist
 Skyler Shaye as Katie Bryce
 Casey Wilson as Courtney Hall
 Rita Moreno as Gayle McColl
 Robert Baker as Dr. Charles Percy
 Gwendoline Yeo as Michelle Carpio

Production

Development 
On May 7, 2015, ABC renewed Grey's Anatomy for a twelfth season for the 2015-16 television season. ABC president Paul Lee confirmed that the twelfth season would not be the final season, as he said "I would like to see it run for many, many years to come. It is powerful, vibrant brand with incredibly passionate audiences" Debbie Allen was promoted to executive producer for the twelfth season, and directed multiple episodes for the season while still recurring on camera as Dr. Catherine Avery. Production began on May 21, 2015, when Rhimes announced on Twitter that the writers were in full swing mapping the twelfth season. A promotional poster was released on September 16, 2015.  

The season included the 250th episode named "Guess Who's Coming to Dinner", being the fifth episode. The cast of Grey's Anatomy had a special celebration for the 250th episode of the show with several actors sharing the celebration on Twitter on September 15, 2015. Jessica Capshaw revealed that the episode included her favorite scene so far in the season. Because of the annual Halloween television special It's the Great Pumpkin, Charlie Brown, the twelfth season had a hiatus on October 29, 2015 following the 250th episode.

The remaining fall schedule for ABC was announced on November 16, 2015 where it was announced that Grey's Anatomy would air 8 episodes in the fall with the fall finale to air on November 19, 2015, just like the rest of ABC's primetime lineup "TGIT" Scandal and How to Get Away with Murder, which was the same last year. The remaining 16 episodes will air after the winter break, beginning on February 11, 2016, and ending on May 19, 2016, as a result of ABC airing the television miniseries Madoff over 2 nights on February 3–4, 2016 in the same time-slot as Grey's Anatomy and Scandal. On March 3, 2016, ABC announced that Grey's Anatomy was renewed for a 13th season.

Writing 
Regarding the death of Dr. Derek Shepherd, showrunner Shonda Rhimes commented on how future seasons would be affected by the death as she said: "Now, Meredith and the entire Grey’s Anatomy family are about to enter uncharted territory as we head into this new chapter of her life. The possibilities for what may come are endless. As Ellis Grey would say: the carousel never stops turning."

During an interview with TVLine, Shonda Rhimes said that the twelfth season will take "a much lighter tone" in the wake of Derek's death. She continued talking about Meredith's evolvement as she said "Meredith is single, and she is living this life that she’s never thought she’d be living again. She’s living in a house with her sisters. She’s surrounded by women who are dating and having a whole life, and she’s not interested in all that. [Meredith is] starting to wonder is there a second life here or are your best years behind you? I guess the theme [of Season 12] is rebirth. That evolution for that character is beautiful".

Casting 
On January 23, 2014, it was reported that Ellen Pompeo and Patrick Dempsey had renewed their contracts for another 2 seasons, as Drs. Meredith Grey and Derek Shepherd, respectively, meaning their characters would be staying on the medical drama for seasons 11 and 12. On April 24, 2015, Patrick Dempsey revealed that he would be leaving Grey's Anatomy after the eleventh season despite having a contract through another season. Thus, this will be the first season in which Dr. Derek Shepherd, portrayed by Patrick Dempsey, is not included in the main cast of characters. Dempsey's character Dr. Derek Shepherd was killed off towards the end of the eleventh season in the episode "How to Save a Life", meaning he will not return for the twelfth season as previously thought. ABC put out a statement claiming Dempsey wanted to pursue other interests. 

On May 2, 2014, the rest of the 6 original cast mates, Justin Chambers, Chandra Wilson and James Pickens Jr., excluding Sandra Oh, renewed their contracts for another two seasons (11 and 12) as Drs. Alex Karev, Miranda Bailey, and Richard Webber, respectively. Sara Ramirez also renewed her contract for another 2 seasons as Dr. Callie Torres, which will run out after the twelfth season. However, it was later announced on May 20, 2016 that Sara Ramirez, who portrayed Callie Torres for 10 seasons, would leave Grey's. Chambers announced on March 11, 2016, on Twitter that he will return as Dr. Alex Karev for the 13th season.

On June 5, 2015, it was announced that after several seasons of being a recurring role, Jason George was upgraded to a series-regular. It was announced on June 15, 2015, that Martin Henderson, who played a doctor on the ShondaLand produced show Off the Map, would be added as a series-regular for the twelfth season. He will make his debut in the middle of the season, according to Rhimes. On June 28, 2015, it was announced that Jessica Capshaw, whose contract expired after Season 11, had renewed her contract for another 3 seasons as Dr. Arizona Robbins. This means that her character will be staying on the show through seasons 12 as well as possible seasons 13 and 14. 

It was announced on September 11, 2015 that Chasing Amy actress Joey Lauren Adams would guest star as Dr. Tracy McConnell, Dr. Bailey's opponent for Chief of Surgery, and appeared in the season premiere. TV veteran Bill Smitrovich was announced on November 12, 2015, to guest star as a therapist in the tenth episode of the season. After appearing as Dr. Andrew DeLuca as a guest-star in the first eight episodes, Giacomo Gianniotti was upgraded to a series-regular on January 8, 2016. It was announced on January 8, 2016 that Maya Stojan will appear in 1 episode as a guest-star which later turned out to be Jackson's patient Tatiana whom he treated over several years. On February 26, 2016, it was announced that Casey Wilson and Rita Moreno would both guest star in episode 14 of the season. Variety announced on March 8, 2016, that Wilmer Valderrama was cast as Kyle Diaz, a recurring role which he will play in a multi-episode arc.

The season marked the last appearance for long-time cast member Sara Ramirez who played Dr. Callie Torres on the series since 2006. Her character was involved in a custody battle with ex-wife Dr. Arizona Robbins, played by Jessica Capshaw, which led to the former's move to New York from Seattle. On May 19, in a note posted on Twitter after the season finale, Ramirez wrote that she was “taking some welcome time off.” Rhimes replied to the tweet by saying, “I will miss Callie tremendously, but am excited for what the future holds for Sara. She will always have a home at Shondaland.” Later, speaking at the Vulture Festival in New York City on May 22, Rhimes, told that she didn't know that Ramirez was leaving until they had shot the finale. She addressed  Callie's send-off and said, “This one was different because it wasn’t a big planned thing, I had a different plan going and when Sara came in and said, ‘I really need to take this break,’ I was lucky that we’d shot the end of the season with her going to New York.”

Filming 
Prepping for the season began on July 13, 2015. The table read for the premiere was on July 15, 2015. Filming began on July 22, 2015. Two-time Academy Awards winner Denzel Washington was announced by TVLine to direct the ninth episode of the season, which will be Washington's first go at directing television. He previously directed the films Antwone Fisher and The Great Debaters .

Reception

Ratings

Live + SD ratings

Live + 7 Day (DVR) ratings

Critical response 
NPR listed Grey's Anatomy as #7 on their list of the best television of 2015. A.V. Club's Caroline Siede described the twelfth season of Grey's Anatomy as "phenomenal", stating that the series underwent a "powerful renaissance this year". A final grade of A− was given to the season.

Accolades

DVD release

References 

2015 American television seasons
2016 American television seasons
Grey's Anatomy seasons